Germany's Next Topmodel, cycle 17 is the seventeenth cycle of Germany's Next Topmodel. It aired on ProSieben from February 3, 2022. For the fourth straight year, only the host (Heidi Klum) herself appeared in the judges panel, as one or more guest judges were featured for each episode.

The prizes include a cover and spread in the German edition of Harper's Bazaar, a €100,000 cash prize, and a campaign with MAC Cosmetics.

The international destinations of this cycle are Athens, Mykonos, Los Angeles and Ibiza. Due to the COVID-19 epidemic, this season is filmed under strict COVID-19 regulations like travel restrictions. Nevertheless, this was the first cycle to film abroad since the fifteenth cycle since the previous cycle was filmed entirely in Germany.

The winner of this season was 18-year-old Lou-Anne Gleißenebner-Teskey from Klosterneuburg, Austria, who is notably the first model in Top Model history to compete with her mother.

This cycle also features a variety of models of varying ages, heights and shapes.

Contestants 
Ages stated are as of the beginning of the contest

Episode summaries

Episode 1: Auftakt in Athens 
Original airdate: 

The new season starts with the arrival of the 31 finalists of Germany's Next Topmodel 2022 in Athens, Greece. Guest judge Kylie Minogue joins Heidi, in selecting who moves on in the hopes of becoming Germany's Next Top Model. Emilie, Meline and Pauline were eliminated at panel. The remainder of the girls were put through to next week where they were informed the competition will take place in Mykonos.

Eliminated: Emilie Clement, Meline Kermut & Pauline Schäfer
Special guests: Jasmin Erbas & Kylie Minogue

Episode 2: Bootcamp Edition 
Original airdate: 

Immune: Amaya Baker, Anita Schaller, Luca Lorenz, Martina Gleißenebner-Teskey, Paulina Stępowska & Vivien Sterk
Bottom four: Kim Bieder, Kristina Ber, Sophie Dräger & Wiebke Schwartau
Eliminated: Kim Bieder & Wiebke Schwartau
Featured photographer: Yu Tsai
Special guests: Yu Tsai

Episode 3: Promo Edition 
Original airdate: 

Immune: Amaya Baker, Annalotta Bönninger, Barbara Radtke, Jessica Adwubi, Kashmira Maduwege, Lena Krüger, Lou-Anne Gleißenebner-Teskey, Luca Lorenz, Paulina Stępowska & Sophie Dräger
Eliminated: Kristina Ber & Lisa-Marie Cordt
Featured photographer/director: Rankin
Special guests: Christian Cowan & Rankin

Episode 4: Action Edition
Original airdate: 

Quit: Lenara Klawitter
Bottom two: Kashmira Maduwege & Laura Wentz
Eliminated: Kashmira Maduwege
Featured director: David Helmut
Special guests: Jasmine Sanders

Episode 5: Casting Edition 
Original airdate: 

Booked for job: Amaya Baker, Barbara Radtke, Juliana Stürmer, Lou-Anne Gleißenebner-Teskey, Sophie Dräger, & Viola Schierenbeck 
Immune: Amaya Baker, Barbara Radtke, Juliana Stürmer, Lou-Anne Gleißenebner-Teskey, & Sophie Dräger
Bottom Three: Julia Weinhäupl, Laura Wentz & Paulina Stępowska
Eliminated: Laura Wentz
Special guests: Jean Paul Gaultier

Episode 6: Das große GNTM Umstyling! 
Original airdate: 

Best performance: Amaya Baker, Lou-Anne Gleißenebner-Teskey, Viola Schierenbeck & Vivien Sterk
Bottom five: Anita Schaller, Barbara Radtke, Jasmin Jägers, Jessica Adwubi & Julia Weinhäupl
Eliminated: Barbara Radtke & Jasmin Jägers
Featured photographer: Richard Hübner
Special guests: Sarina Novak

Episode 7: Sedcard-Shooting 
Original airdate: 

Best performance: Inka Ferbert, Luca Lorenz & Vanessa Kunz
Bottom two: Laura Bittner & Viola Schierenbeck
Eliminated: Julia Weinhäupl & Laura Bittner
Featured photographer: Sheryl Nields 
Special guests: Coco Rocha (In-person guesting) & Stefanie Giesinger (Online guesting)

Episode 8: Social Media Edition 
Original airdate: 

Best performance: Anita Schaller, Luca Lorenz & Noëlla Mbomba
Bottom three: Jessica Adwubi, Lieselotte Reznicek & Paulina Stępowska
Eliminated: Jessica Adwubi & Paulina Stępowska
Featured director : Mario Schmolka
Special guests: Claudia von Brauchitsch & The Blonds

Episode 9: Fantasy Edition 
Original airdate: 

Booked for job: Inka Ferbert, Juliana Stürmer & Noëlla Mbomba
Best performance: Martina Gleißenebner-Teskey & Vivien Sterk
Bottom two: Annalotta Bönninger & Lieselotte Reznicek 
Eliminated: Annalotta Bönninger
Featured photographer: Marc Baptiste
Special guests: Pabllo Vittar & Nikeata Thompson

Episode 10: Castingmarathon in L.A. 
Original airdate: 

Booked for job: Anita Schaller, Luca Lorenz, Martina Gleißenebner-Teskey, Noëlla Mbomba & Vivien Sterk
Bottom four: Inka Ferbert, Lena Krüger, Lou-Anne Gleißenebner-Teskey & Viola Schierenbeck
Eliminated: Inka Ferbert & Viola Schierenbeck
Featured photographer: Vijat Mohindra
Special guests: Jeremy Scott

Episode 11: Bodypainting-Shooting 
Original airdate: 

Booked for job: Martina Gleißenebner-Teskey 
Best performance: Vivien Sterk
Bottom three: Amaya Baker, Anita Schaller & Sophie Dräger
Eliminated: Amaya Baker 
Featured photographer: Brian Bowen Smith 
Special guests: Maye Musk & Soulin Omar

Episode 12: Der Einzug in die Top 10 
Original airdate: 

Bottom three: Anita Schaller, Noëlla Mbomba & Vanessa Kunz
Eliminated: Vanessa Kunz
Featured photographer: Yu Tsai
Special guests: Nikeata Thompson & Peter Dundas

Episode 13: Dream Edition 
Original airdate: 

Booked for job: Vivien Sterk
Best performance: Lou-Anne Gleißenebner-Teskey
Eliminated: Juliana Stürmer & Sophie Dräger
Featured director: Lance Drake 
Special guests: Brigitte Nielsen & Kim Petras

Episode 14: Sportsfest 
Original airdate: 

Booked for job / Best performance: Noëlla Mbomba
Bottom three: Lena Krüger, Luca Lorenz & Martina Gleißenebner-Teskey
Eliminated: Lena Krüger
Featured photographer: Max Montgomery 
Special guests: Thomas Hayo

Episode 15: Cover-shooting für die Harper’s Bazaar 
Original airdate: 

Best performance: Lieselotte Reznicek, Lou-Anne Gleißenebner-Teskey & Luca Lorenz
Eliminated: Vivien Sterk
Featured photographer: Regan Cameron
Special guests: Ava Max & Kerstin Schneider

Episode 16: Skyline Shooting 
Original airdate: 

Best performance: Anita Schaller
Bottom two: Lieselotte Reznicek & Noëlla Mbomba 
Eliminated: Lieselotte Reznicek
Featured photographer: Kristian Schuller
Special guests: Leni Klum

Episode 17: Das große Finale 
Original airdate: 

Final five: Anita Schaller, Lou-Anne Gleißenebner-Teskey, Luca Lorenz, Martina Gleißenebner-Teskey and Noëlla Mbomba 
Bottom two: Anita Schaller and Martina Gleißenebner-Teskey
Eliminated: Anita Schaller
Final four: Lou-Anne Gleißenebner-Teskey, Luca Lorenz, Martina Gleißenebner-Teskey and Noëlla Mbomba
Bottom two: Martina Gleißenebner-Teskey and Noëlla Mbomba
Eliminated: Noëlla Mbomba
Personality Award: Sophie Dräger
Final three: Lou-Anne Gleißenebner-Teskey, Luca Lorenz and Martina Gleißenebner-Teskey
Bottom two: Lou-Anne and Martina Gleißenebner-Teskey
Eliminated: Martina Gleißenebner-Teskey
Final two: Lou-Anne Gleißenebner-Teskey and Luca Lorenz
Germany's Next Topmodel: Lou-Anne Gleißenebner-Teskey
Featured photographer: Ellen von Unwerth 
Special guests: Alex-Mariah Peter, Dascha Carriero, Jeremy Scott, Julian Macdonald, Killian Kerner, Liliana Maxwell, Måneskin, Marina Hoermanseder, Nikeata Thompson, Romina Palm, Soulin Omar & Tom Kaulitz

Summaries 

 The contestant won best performance 
 The contestant was immune from elimination
 The contestant withdrew from the competition
 The contestant was eliminated
 The contestant was in danger of elimination
 The contestant won the competition

Photo shoot guide
Episode 2 photo shoot: Tug of war in pairs
Episode 3 photo shoot and video shoot: Promo shoot in groups + opening credits with Heidi Klum
Episode 4 video shoot: Portraying old timers while acting out an argument scene
Episode 6 photo shoot: Posing at the runway in velvet catsuits
Episode 7 photo shoot: Sedcard & yeswecan!cer 2022/2023 Calendar Campaign
Episode 8 video shoot: Portraying social media influencers while selling a product
Episode 9 photo shoot: Posing in Plush Couture in heights in groups
Episode 10 photo shoot: Portraying retro housewives dressed in Moschino
Episode 11 photo shoot: Posing nude covered in gold body paint on a big clock
Episode 12 photo shoot: Jumping on a trampoline in Los Angeles
Episode 13 video shoot: Portraying visitors in a jail phone booth with Brigitte Nielsen
Episode 14 photo shoot: Playing tennis showcasing white fashion gowns
Episode 15 photo shoot: Harper's Bazaar cover-try
Episode 16 photo shoot: Posing in heights & couture dresses
Episode 17 photo shoot: Jumping on a pink giant bed dressed in Moschino

Controversies
Jasmin Jägers boycotted the live finale of season 17. Due to the bad experiences of former participants, she no longer wants to be associated with Germany's Next Topmodel.

During the live finale Heidi Klum said towards the criticism of the show: "Dear critics, unfortunately I have to disappoint you. We're going on as before." This was condemned in the strongest terms by both the German media and viewers and caused outrage in Germany. Der Spiegel (online) headlined: "Final in Heidi's torture cellar". Stern (magazine) headlined "Stupid instead of diversity - how Heidi Klum doesn't want to change anything" and T-Online said: "The ego show of the GNTM deadbeat mom". The well-known German comedian Carolin Kebekus said "Germany's Next Topmodel made many great: eating disorders, self-loathing, cyberbullying" and "this year they went crazy for diversity because every woman has the right to be humiliated by Heidi Klum."

In August 2022 in the wake of allegations by former participants against Germany's Next Topmodel, the winner of the 14th season, Simone Kowalski, also spoke up as she said: "Top Model is very dangerous for today's and the previous generations! Many young women have mental trauma! Heidi says she's just being the hostess, but she has a responsibility to at least face the pain and trauma that has been inflicted on many girls!". Kowalski also teamed up with America's Next Top Model contestant Lisa D'Amato to talk about her traumatic experiences with Germany's Next Topmodel. She said during the interview, that Germany’s Next Topmodel made her sick: "They took everything from me, I almost lost my family, my friends, all my money. It was inhuman - they broke me mentally. I came on the show healthy and got sick." She also said that after the show she was forced against her will to work for Heidi Klum's father. To former contestants defending the show, she says: "Good for you, but not for everyone". In her opinion, Germany's Next Topmodel should be discontinued.

In February 2023 Der Spiegel (online) gives a glimpse into the notorious gag contracts that candidates have to sign in order to be able to take part in the Heidi Klum show. According to the Hamburg lawyer Jörg Nabert, these are "illegal gag contracts". The contract binds the women to an agency for two years. A regulation that, according to Nabert, is not customary in the industry. The participants also agree that the recordings "present them in a way that they don't like themselves". According to Der Spiegel (online), the contracts say: "The contributors are aware of any burdens that may result for them". If necessary, “substantive suggestions” would be made and enforced by the show management. Germany's Next Topmodel can thus stylize people like Tessa Bergmeier (Season 4) as "bitches" without them being able to defend themselves effectively afterwards. Heidi Klum's casting show goes further than similar formats with this practice.

In February 2023, the Berliner Zeitung published an article about the show with the headline: "Why isn't Germany’s Next Topmodel actually canceled?" 

In February 2023, the German InTouch wrote: "The willingness to use violence among girls is increasing. They form gangs, bully, hit. Heidi is also partly responsible for the fact that, at least on TV, such behavior should not lead to extra airtime..." The article goes on to say: "With Germany’s Next Topmodel absolutely wrong values ​​​​are conveyed. It gives the impression that bullying is a legitimate means of dealing with each other."

In February 2023, the Neue Osnabrücker Zeitung wrote that Germany’s Next Topmodel is one of the worst trash TV programs on German television. And: "anyone who watches Heidi Klum is just as bad as she is."

In February 2023, the former judge Peyman Armin criticized the show and Heidi Klum as well. He said: "It has become a pure self-portrayal by Heidi. Heidi comes first. Then Heidi and Heidi again. When Heidi Klum is in the foreground and takes care of the slapstick, for sensational shootings and catfights." Part of the episodes are therefore always scenes in which Heidi Klum would blaspheme with jurors about the contestants.

Also in February 2023, former judge Wolfgang Joop criticized the show and Heidi Klum again when he said he had no say in the decisions. "Heidi does that. Nobody can help there." Not even the producers were allowed to have a say, apart from the timing of the direction. Joop: "Then they say something like: 'Don't let her go yet, the boyfriend will come, that'll bring a lot of tears of joy, we'll take that with us.'" He added: "I wouldn't have been surprised if the show had been discontinued."

In February 2023 at the beginning of the 18th season, Heidi Klum gave a 10-minute speech in which she denied all allegations against her and the show and blamed the candidates themselves. This was once again heavily criticized by both the viewers and the media in Germany. The Berliner Morgenpost wrote: "Everything is wrong, says Klum. She emphasized that 'everything is real' on her show. There is no text or storyline for the models. That's why it's not her fault if a young model feels misrepresented after the broadcast. 'We can only portray a person as they are,' philosophizes Klum. Whether this is true remains questionable. On the one hand, because a story can be cobbled together afterwards that doesn't have to have anything to do with reality. On the other hand, because in the show very young girls in absolutely exceptional and stressful situations meet experienced editors who know exactly what the viewers later want to see on television." Die Welt called Heidi Klum's statement "bizarre". Frankfurter Allgemeine called it a "Catwalk of Shame". Web.de headlined: "Why Heidi Klum's statement is dishonest". Annabelle (magazine) (Switzerland) headlined: "Heidi Klum, this justification went wrong". In an article, Puls24 (Austria) asked whether Heidi Klum practiced perpetrator-victim reversal and Gaslighting. Frankfurter Allgemeine headlined: "This woman only has dollar signs in her eyes" and also assumed that Heidi Klum was doing a perpetrator-victim reversal. BILD asked: "How evil is Heidi Klum really?".

In March 2023 former judge Peyman Armin apologized to Lijana Kaggwa for what she had to experience on Germany's Next Topmodel. He also apologized for being part of Germany's Next Topmodel and promised to never take part in the show again. All of this was broadcast in the format "13 questions" on ZDF.

References

External links 
Official Website

2022 German television seasons
Germany's Next Topmodel
Television series impacted by the COVID-19 pandemic
Television shows filmed in Germany
Television shows filmed in Greece
Television shows filmed in Los Angeles
Television shows filmed in Spain